The Jagiellonian University (Polish: Uniwersytet Jagielloński, UJ) is a public research university in Kraków, Poland. Founded in 1364 by King Casimir III the Great, it is the oldest university in Poland and the 13th oldest university in continuous operation in the world. It is regarded as Poland's most prestigious academic institution. The university has been viewed as a guardian of Polish culture as well as a significant contributor to the intellectual heritage of Europe.

The campus of the Jagiellonian University is centrally located within the city of Kraków. The university consists of thirteen main faculties, in addition to three faculties composing the Collegium Medicum. It employs roughly 4,000 academics and provides education to more than 35,000 students who study in 166 fields. The main language of instruction is Polish, although around 30 degrees are offered in English and some in German. The university library is among the largest of its kind and houses a number of medieval manuscripts, including the landmark De Revolutionibus by alumnus Nicolaus Copernicus.

In addition to Copernicus, the university's notable alumni include heads of state King John III Sobieski, Pope John Paul II, and Andrzej Duda; Polish prime ministers Beata Szydło and Józef Cyrankiewicz; renowned cultural figures Jan Kochanowski, Stanisław Lem, and Krzysztof Penderecki; and leading intellectuals and researchers such as Hugo Kołłątaj, Bronisław Malinowski, Carl Menger, Leo Sternbach, and Norman Davies. Four Nobel laureates have been affiliated with the university, all in literature: Ivo Andrić and Wisława Szymborska, who studied there, and Czesław Miłosz and Olga Tokarczuk, who taught there. Faculty and graduates of the university have been elected to the Polish Academy of Arts and Sciences, the Royal Society, the British Academy, the American Academy of Arts and Sciences, and other honorary societies.

The Jagiellonian University is consistently ranked among the top universities in the world. The CWTS Leiden Ranking, which reviews the scientific performance of more than 1,200 global universities, has placed the university at #1 in Poland, #74 regionally, and #250 globally.

History

Founding the university

In the mid-14th century, King Casimir III the Great realised that the nation needed a class of educated people, especially lawyers, who could arrange a better set of the country's laws and administer the courts and offices. His efforts to found an institution of higher learning in Poland were rewarded when Pope Urban V granted him permission to set up a university in Kraków. A royal charter of foundation was issued on 12 May 1364, and a simultaneous document was issued by the city council granting privileges to the Studium Generale.

Development of the University of Kraków stalled upon the death of Casimir III, and lectures were held in various places across the city, including, amongst others, in professors' houses, churches and in the cathedral school on the Wawel Hill. It is believed that the construction of a building to house the Studium Generale began on Plac Wolnica in what is today the district of Kazimierz.

After a period of low interest and lack of funds, the institution was restored in the 1390s by Jadwiga, king of Poland, the daughter of Louis the Great. The royal couple, Jadwiga and her husband Władysław II Jagiełło decided that, instead of building new premises for the university, it would be better to buy an existing edifice; it was thus that a building on Żydowska Street, which had previously been the property of the Pęcherz family, was acquired in 1399. The Queen donated all of her personal jewellery to the university, allowing it to enroll 203 students. The faculties of astronomy, law and theology attracted eminent scholars: for example, John Cantius, Stanisław of Skarbimierz, Paweł Włodkowic, Jan of Głogów, and Albert Brudzewski, who from 1491 to 1495 was one of Nicolaus Copernicus' teachers. The university was the first university in Europe to establish independent chairs in Mathematics and Astronomy. This rapid expansion in the university's faculty necessitated the purchase of larger premises in which to house them; it was thus that the building known today as the Collegium Maius, with its quadrangle and beautiful arcade, came into being towards the beginning of the 15th century. The Collegium Maius''' qualities, many of which directly contributed to the sheltered, academic atmosphere at the university, became widely respected, helping the university establish its reputation as a place of learning in Central Europe.

Golden age of the Renaissance

For several centuries, almost the entire intellectual elite of Poland was educated at the university, where they enjoyed particular royal favors. While it was, and largely remains, Polish students who make up the majority of the university's students, it has, over its long history, educated thousands of foreign students from countries such as Lithuania, Russia, Hungary, Bohemia, Germany, and Spain. During the second half of the 15th century, over 40 percent of students came from the outside of the Kingdom of Poland.

The first chancellor of the university was Piotr Wysz, and the first professors were Czechs, Germans and Poles, most of them trained at the Charles University in Prague. By 1520 Greek philology was introduced by Constanzo Claretti and Wenzel von Hirschberg; Hebrew was also taught. At this time, the Collegium Maius consisted of seven reading rooms, six of which were named for the great ancient scholars: Aristotle, Socrates, Plato, Galen, Ptolemy, and Pythagoras. Furthermore, it was during this period that the faculties of Law, Medicine, Theology, and Philosophy were established in their own premises; two of these buildings, the Collegium Iuridicum and Collegium Minus, survive to this day. The golden era of the University of Kraków took place during the Polish Renaissance, between 1500 and 1535, when it was attended by 3,215 students in the first decade of the 16th century, and it was in these years that the foundations for the Jagiellonian Library were set, which allowed for the addition of a library floor to the Collegium Maius. The library's original rooms in which all books were chained to their cases in order to prevent theft are no longer used as such. However, they are still occasionally open to hosting visiting lecturers' talks.

As the university's popularity, along with that of the ever more provincial Kraków's, declined in later centuries, the number of students attending the university also fell and, as such, the attendance record set in the early 16th-century wasn't surpassed until the late 18th century. This phenomenon was recorded as part of a more general economic and political decline seen in the Polish–Lithuanian Commonwealth, which was suffering from the effects of poor governance and the policies of hostile neighbors at the time. In fact, despite a number of expansion projects during the late 18th century, many of the university's buildings had fallen into disrepair and were being used for a range of other purposes; in the university's archives, there is one entry which reads: 'Nobody lives in the building, nothing happens there. If the lecture halls underwent refurbishment they could be rented out to accommodate a laundry'. This period thus represents one of the darkest periods in the university's history and is almost certainly the one during which the closure of the institution seemed most imminent.

Turmoil and near closure after the partitions

After the third partition of Poland in 1795 and the ensuing Napoleonic Wars, Kraków became a free city under the protection of the Austrian Empire; this, however, was not to last long. In 1846, after the Kraków Uprising, the city and its university became part of the Austrian Empire. The Austrians were in many ways hostile to the institution and, soon after their arrival, removed many of the furnishings from the Collegium Maius' Auditorium Maximum in order to convert it into a grain store. However, the threat of closure of the University was ultimately dissipated by Ferdinand I of Austria's decree to maintain it. By the 1870s the fortunes of the university had improved so greatly that many scholars had returned. The liquefaction of nitrogen and oxygen was successfully demonstrated by professors Zygmunt Wróblewski and Karol Olszewski in 1883. Thereafter the Austrian authorities took on a new role in the development of the university and provided funds for the construction of a number of new buildings, including the neo-gothic Collegium Novum, which opened in 1887. It was, conversely, from this building that in 1918 a large painting of Kaiser Franz Joseph was removed and destroyed by Polish students advocating the reestablishment of an independent Polish state.

For the 500th anniversary of the university's foundation, a monument to Copernicus was placed in the quadrangle of the Collegium Maius; this statue is now to be found in the direct vicinity of the Collegium Novum, outside the Collegium Witkowskiego, to where it was moved in 1953. Nevertheless, it was in the Grzegórzecka and the Kopernika areas that much of the university's expansion took place up to 1918; during this time the Collegium Medicum was relocated to a site just east of the centre, and was expanded with the addition of a number of modern teaching hospitals – this 'medical campus' remains to this day. By the late 1930s, the number of students at the university had increased dramatically to almost six thousand. Now a major centre for education in the independent Republic of Poland, the university attained government support for the purchase of building plots for new premises, as a result of which a number of residencies were built for students and professors alike. However, of all the projects begun during this era, the most important would have to be the creation of the Jagiellonian Library. The library's monumental building, construction of which began in 1931, was finally completed towards the end of the interwar period, which allowed the university's many varied literary collections to be relocated to their new home by the outbreak of war in 1939.

Modern era and renovation
On November 6, 1939, following the Nazi invasion of Poland, 184 professors were arrested and deported to Sachsenhausen concentration camp during an operation codenamed Sonderaktion Krakau (Special Operation Krakow). The university, along with the rest of Poland's higher and secondary education, was closed for the remainder of World War II. Despite the university's reopening after the cessation of hostilities in 1945, the new government of Poland was hostile to the teachings of the pre-war university and the faculty was suppressed by the Communists in 1954. By 1957 the Polish government decided that it would invest in the establishment of new facilities near Jordan Park and expansion of other smaller existing facilities. Construction work proved slow and many of the stated goals were never achieved; it was this poor management that eventually led a number of scholars to openly criticise the government for its apparent lack of interest in educational development and disregard for the university's future. A number of new buildings, such as the Collegium Paderevianum, were built with funds from the legacy of Ignacy Paderewski.

By 1989 Poland had overthrown its Communist government. In that same year, the Jagiellonian University successfully completed the purchase of its first building plot in Pychowice, Kraków, where, from 2000, construction of a new complex of university buildings, the so-called Third Campus, began. The new campus, officially named the '600th Anniversary Campus', was developed in conjunction with the new LifeScience Park, which is managed by the Jagiellonian Centre for Innovation, the university's research consortium. Public funds earmarked for the project amounted to 946.5 million zlotys, or 240 million euros. Poland's entry into the European Union in 2004 has proved instrumental in improving the fortunes of the Jagiellonian University, which has seen huge increases in funding from both central government and European authorities, allowing it to develop new departments, research centres, and better support the work of its students and academics.

International partnerships

The university's academic advancement in both Poland and abroad is illustrated by its widely recognized research achievements. The scientists and physicians from the Collegium Medicum carry out pioneer studies, e.g. in cardiac surgery, urology and neurology, often leading to the development of novel treatment methods. Their findings have been published in international journals such as European Journal of Cardio-Thoracic Medicine, New England Journal of Medicine, and The Lancet. UJ archaeologists lead explorations of ancient sites in various parts of the world, including Egypt, Cyprus, Central America, South Asia and Altay. The astronomers take part in major international projects, including H.E.S.S. and VIPERS. The work of UJ bio-technologists has been published in journals, such as Bioorganic & Medicinal Chemistry, Molecular Ecology Resources, and European Journal of Human Genetics.

In the English-speaking world, the Jagiellonian University has international partnerships with the University of Cambridge, University of Melbourne, University of Chicago, University of California, Los Angeles, London School of Economics, University of Rochester, University of California, Irvine, Case Western Reserve University. In the French-speaking world, partner universities include the Sorbonne, University of Montpellier. UJ also maintains strong academic partnership with Heidelberg University, Germany's oldest university. The Jagiellonian University offers specializations in German law, in conjunction with Heidelberg University and Johannes Gutenberg University of Mainz.

Other cooperation agreements exist with Charles University Prague, University of Vienna, University of Tokyo, Saint Petersburg State University, Technical University of Munich, and Free University of Berlin.

Libraries

The university's main library, the Jagiellonian Library (Biblioteka Jagiellońska), is one of Poland's largest, with almost 6.5 million volumes; it is a constituent of the Polish National Libraries system. It is home to a world-renowned collection of medieval manuscripts, which includes Copernicus' De Revolutionibus, the Balthasar Behem Codex and the Berlinka. The library also has an extensive collection of underground political literature (so-called drugi obieg or samizdat) from Poland's period of Communist rule between 1945 and 1989.

The beginning of the Jagiellonian Library is traditionally considered the same as that of the entire university – in 1364; however, instead of having one central library it had several smaller branches at buildings of various departments (the largest collection was in Collegium Maius, where works related to theology and liberal arts were kept). After 1775, during the reforms of Komisja Edukacji Narodowej, which established the first Ministry of Education in the world, various small libraries of the university were formally centralised into one public collection in Collegium Maius. During the partitions of Poland, the library continued to grow thanks to the support of such people as Karol Józef Teofil Estreicher and Karol Estreicher. Its collections were made public in 1812. Since 1932, it has been recognised as a legal deposit library, comparable to the Bodleian Library at the University of Oxford or Cambridge University Library or Trinity College Library in Dublin, and thus has the right to receive a copy of any book issued by Polish publishers within Poland. In 1940, the library finally obtained a new building of its own, which has subsequently been expanded on two occasions, most recently in 1995–2001. During the Second World War, library workers cooperated with underground universities. Since the 1990s, the library's collection has become increasingly digitised.

In addition to the Jagiellonian Library, the university maintains a large medical library (Biblioteka Medyczna'') and many other subject specialised libraries in its various faculties and institutes. Finally, the collections of the university libraries' collections are enriched by the presence of the university's archives, which date back to the university's own foundation and record the entire history of its development up to the present day.

Notable alumni

Faculties and departments

The university is divided into the following faculties, which have different organisational sub-structures partly reflecting their history and partly their operational needs. Teaching and research at UJ are organised by these faculties, including a number of additional institutes:

 Law and Administration
 Medicine 
 Pharmacy and Medical Analysis
 Health Care
 Philosophy
 History
 Philology
 Polish Language and Literature
 Physics, Astronomy and Applied Computer Science
 Mathematics and Computer Science
 Chemistry
 Biology
 Earth Sciences
 Management and Social Communication
 International and Political Studies
 Biochemistry, Biophysics and Biotechnology
 University Center of Veterinary Medicine (joint faculty with Agricultural University of Kraków)
 National Center of Synchrotron Radiation SOLARIS (off-departmental facility)
Jagiellonian University Collegium Medicum is affiliated with the following hospitals and clinics:

University Hospital in Krakow-Prokocim
 Children's University Hospital in Krakow
 University Hospital for Orthopedics and Rehabilitation in Zakopane
 Dental University Clinic in Krakow
 John Paul II's Specialist Hospital in Krakow

The new seat of the University Hospital has been recently opened at Prokocim in 2019, as a result of more than 1.2 billion zloty investment projects. As 2022 the University Hospital in Krakow is the biggest supra-regional public hospital in Poland and comprises: 37 clinical departments, 12 diagnostic and research institutes, and 71 out-patient units.

Notable professors

 Stanisław of Skarbimierz (1360–1431), rector, theologian, lawyer
 Paweł Włodkowic (1370–1435), lawyer, diplomat and politician, representative of Poland at the Council of Constance
 Albert Brudzewski (1445–1497), astronomer and mathematician
 Maciej Miechowita (1457–1523), historian, chronicler, geographer, medic
 Marcin Szlachciński (1511/1512–?), scholar, translator, poet and philosopher
 Jan Brożek (1585–1652), mathematician, physician and astronomer
 Franz Mertens (1840–1927), mathematician
 Henryk Jordan (1842–1907), professor of obstetrics
 Walery Jaworski (1849–1924), gastroenterologist
 Ludwik Rydygier (1850–1920), general surgeon
 Albert Wojciech Adamkiewicz (1850–1921), pathologist, discovered the Artery of Adamkiewicz and the Adamkiewicz reaction
 Napoleon Cybulski (1854-1919), pioneer in endocrinology
 Edmund Załęski (1863–1932), agrotechnician and chemist
 Władysław Natanson (1864–1937), physicist
 Stanisław Estreicher (1869–1939), founder of the Jagiellonian University Museum
 Tadeusz Estreicher (1871–1952), pioneer in cryogenics
 Marian Smoluchowski (1872–1917), pioneer of statistical physics
 Bohdan Lepky (1872–1941), literature
 Franciszek Bujak (1875-1953), historian 
 Stanisław Kutrzeba (1876–1946), rector, General Secretary of the Polish Academy of Learning
 Andrzej Gawroński (1885–1927), founder of the Polish Oriental Society, master of Sanskrit
 Stanisław Kot (1885–1975), historian and politician
 Jan Zawidzki (1886–1928), chemist and historian
 Tadeusz Sulimirski (1898–1983), historian and archaeologist, experts on the ancient Sarmatians
 Roman Grodecki (1889–1964), economic historian
 Stanisław Smreczyński (1899–1975), zoologist
 Henryk Niewodniczański (1900–1968), physicist
 Adam Vetulani (1901–1976), historian of medieval and canon law
 Maria Ludwika Bernhard (1908–1998), archaeologist
 Wisława Szymborska (1923–2012), poet, recipient of the 1996 Nobel Prize in Literature
 Ryszard Gryglewski (born 1932), pharmacologist and physician, a discoverer of prostacyclin
 Andrzej Szczeklik (1932–2012), physician
 Jan Woleński (born 1940), philosopher
 Piotr Sztompka (born 1944), sociologist
 Jan Potempa (born 1955), biologist, recipient of the 2011 Prize of the Foundation for Polish Science
 Krzysztof Kościelniak (born 1965), historian

Student associations
In 1851, the university's first student scientific association was founded. In 2021, over 70 student scientific associations exist at the Jagiellonian University, most of them affiliated with Collegium Medicum. Usually, their purpose is to promote students' scientific achievements by organizing lecture sessions, science excursions, and international student conferences, such as the International Workshop for Young Mathematicians, which is organized by the Zaremba Association of Mathematicians.

The links below provide further information on student activities at the Jagiellonian:
 University Study Oriented System (USOS)
 Scientific Circles 
 Student Organizations
 Ensembles

See also
List of medieval universities
Nawojka, the university's legendary first female student from the 15th century
Sonderaktion Krakau, a Nazi German operation against professors and academics from the University of Kraków
Neuronus IBRO & IRUN Neuroscience Forum
Scholars and Literati at the University of Cracow (1316–1800), Repertorium Eruditorum Totius Europae – RETE

Notes and references

External links

 Official homepage
 Jagiellonian University panoramic view

 
Universities and colleges in Poland
Science and technology in Poland
Educational institutions established in the 14th century
1364 establishments in Europe
14th-century establishments in Poland
Public universities
Universities and colleges in the Polish–Lithuanian Commonwealth